La ruta del dinero K ("K" standing for "Kirchnerism") is a 2016 nonfiction book by Argentine journalist Daniel Santoro. It is an investigation about the eponymous political scandal. The book was written when the case got a renewed speed, during the presidency of Mauricio Macri.

References

Argentine political books
2014 non-fiction books
Kirchnerism